is a national highway of Japan that traverses the prefecture of Niigata in a southwest–northeast routing. It connects the city of Jōetsu in southern Niigata Prefecture to the prefecture's capital city, Niigata, to the north along the Sea of Japan coastline; however the highway mainly functions as the main highway on Sado Island.

Route description

National Route 350 mainly functions as the main highway on Sado Island; however, it is connected by roll-on/roll-off ferries that cross the Sea of Japan to its termini on Honshu at Jōetsu and Niigata.

History
The car ferry between Niigata and Ryōtsu commenced service in March 1967. The opening of this connection led to an increase of vehicular activity on the island. In response, officials on Sado Island sought assistance from the national government to improve the roads of the island; however, the law governing Japan's national highways only allowed for highways that were connected to core cities, special cities, and prefectural capitals to be designated as national highways. These officials petitioned the then-Secretary-General of the Liberal Democratic Party, Kakuei Tanaka, to give the island a national highway by finding a loophole in the law. The loophole was that if the highway began in Niigata (the prefecture's capital city) and ended in Jōetsu (a special city) it did not matter where the highway was routed between. National Route 350 was established by the Cabinet of Japan in 1975 between the cities of Niigata and Jōetsu via the Sado Island ferry ports at Ryōtsu and Ogi, giving the island its only national highway.

Major junctions
The route lies entirely within Niigata Prefecture.

See also

References

External links

350
Roads in Niigata Prefecture